Paradise in Distress is the twenty-third album by Dutch hard rock band Golden Earring, released in 1999 (see 1999 in music). The album was not issued in the U.S.

Track listing
All songs written by Hay and Kooymans except where noted.

"Paradise in Distress" – 5:42
"Apocalypse" – 4:53
"Evil Love Chain" (Hay, Kooymans, E.H. Roelfzema) – 4:16
"Darling" – 5:27
"Take My Hand-Close My Eyes" – 4:48
"The Fighter" – 7:24
"One Night Without You" – 4:32
"Whisper in a Crowd" – 3:37
"Deja Voodoo" (Hay, Kooymans, Roelfzema) – 5:49
"Bad News to Fall in Love" (Hay, Kooymans, Roelfzema) – 5:08
"42nd Street" (Hay, Kooymans, Roelfzema) – 3:00
"Fluid Conduction" – 4:10
"Desperately Trying to Be Different" (Hay, Kooymans, Roelfzema) – 4:08
"Gambler's Blues" (Hay, Kooymans, Roelfzema) – 4:35

Personnel
Rinus Gerritsen - bass, keyboard
Barry Hay - guitar, vocals
George Kooymans - guitar, vocals
Cesar Zuiderwijk - drums

Production
Producers: Golden Earring, John Sonneveld
Engineer: John Sonneveld
Mastering: Miles Showell
Saxophone arrangement: Hans Hollestelle

Charts

Weekly charts

Year-end charts

Certifications

References

Golden Earring albums
1999 albums